Hernando Hoyos (21 June 1921 – 2000) was a Colombian  sports shooter. He competed in the 50 metre pistol event at the 1960 Summer Olympics.

References

1921 births
2000 deaths
Colombian male sport shooters
Olympic shooters of Colombia
Shooters at the 1960 Summer Olympics
People from Tolima Department